Willie Hector, Jr. (born December 23, 1939) was  an American football offensive guard who played one season with the Los Angeles Rams of the National Football League (NFL). He was drafted by the Rams in the fifth round of the 1961 NFL Draft. He was also drafted by the San Diego Chargers of the American Football League (AFL) in the tenth round of the 1961 AFL Draft. Hector played college football at Pacific. He was also a member of the Calgary Stampeders of the Canadian Football League (CFL).

Early years
Hector played high school football at Tamalpais High School in Mill Valley, California and earned all-Northern California honors in 1956.

College career
Hector participated in football and track for the Pacific Tigers of the University of the Pacific. He competed in numerous track events for the Tigers, including the hurdles, high jump, long jump and 100-yard dash. He was named Pacific's Outstanding Track Athlete as a senior in 1961. Hector was inducted into the Pacific Athletics Hall of Fame as part of the 2001-02 class.

Professional career
Hector was selected by the Los Angeles Rams of the NFL with the 60th pick in the 1961 NFL Draft. He was also selected by the San Diego Chargers of the AFL with the 80th pick in the 1961 AFL Draft. He played in twelve games for the Rams during the 1961 season. Hector then played for the Calgary Stampeders of the CFL from 1962 to 1963, appearing in one game in 1962 and five games in 1963.

Coaching career
Hector was the head football coach at Tamalpais High School from the 1965 season through 1968.

Personal life
Willie's sons Zuri and Byron both played football as well. Zuri played as a defensive back for the USC Trojans. Byron played football for the Cal Golden Bears. Willie's grandson Ayden Hector is a four star prospect in the class of 2020 at Eastside Catholic School in Sammamish, Washington. He was named as a defensive back to the Class 3A all-state high school football team in his junior year, after the Eastside Crusaders won the WIAA 3A State Championship.

References

External links
Just Sports Stats

Living people
1939 births
American football offensive guards
Canadian football linebackers
Canadian football offensive linemen
Calgary Stampeders players
Los Angeles Rams players
Pacific Tigers football players
Tamalpais High School alumni
High school football coaches in California
People from New Iberia, Louisiana
Players of American football from Louisiana
African-American coaches of American football
African-American players of American football
African-American players of Canadian football
21st-century African-American people
20th-century African-American sportspeople